In mathematics, a (right) Leibniz algebra, named after Gottfried Wilhelm Leibniz, sometimes called a Loday algebra, after Jean-Louis Loday, is a module L over a commutative ring  R with a bilinear product [ _ , _ ] satisfying the Leibniz identity

In other words, right multiplication by any element c is a derivation. If in addition the bracket is alternating ([a, a] = 0) then the Leibniz algebra is a Lie algebra. Indeed, in this case [a, b] = −[b, a] and the Leibniz's identity is equivalent to Jacobi's identity ([a, [b, c]] + [c, [a, b]] + [b, [c, a]] = 0). Conversely any Lie algebra is obviously a Leibniz algebra.

In this sense, Leibniz algebras can be seen as a non-commutative generalization of Lie algebras.  The investigation of which theorems and properties of Lie algebras are still valid for 
Leibniz algebras is a recurrent theme in the literature. For instance, it has been shown that Engel's theorem still holds for Leibniz algebras and that a weaker version of Levi-Malcev theorem also holds.

The tensor module, T(V) , of any vector space V can be turned into a Loday algebra such that

This is the free Loday algebra over V.

Leibniz algebras were discovered in 1965 by A. Bloh, who called them D-algebras. They attracted interest after Jean-Louis Loday noticed that the classical Chevalley–Eilenberg boundary map in the exterior module of a Lie algebra can be lifted to the tensor module which yields a new chain complex. In fact this complex is well-defined for any Leibniz algebra.  The homology HL(L) of this chain complex is known as Leibniz homology. If L is the Lie algebra of (infinite) matrices over an associative R-algebra A then Leibniz homology
of L is the tensor algebra over the Hochschild homology of A.

A Zinbiel algebra is the Koszul dual concept to a Leibniz algebra.  It has defining identity:

Notes

References

 
 
 
 
 
 
 

Lie algebras
Non-associative algebras